Ram Lal Markanda is an Indian politician and member of the Bharatiya Janata Party. Markanda is a member of the Himachal Pradesh Legislative Assembly from the Lahaul and Spiti constituency in Lahaul and Spiti district.

References 

People from Lahaul and Spiti district
Himachal Vikas Congress politicians
Bharatiya Janata Party politicians from Himachal Pradesh
Living people
Himachal Pradesh MLAs 2017–2022
Year of birth missing (living people)
Himachal Pradesh MLAs 1998–2003
Himachal Pradesh MLAs 2007–2012